The 2018 Weber State Wildcats football team represented Weber State University in the 2018 NCAA Division I FCS football season. The Wildcats were led by fourth-year head coach Jay Hill and played their games at Stewart Stadium as members of the Big Sky Conference. They finished the season 10–3, 7–1 in Big Sky play to finish in a three-way tie for the Big Sky championship with Eastern Washington and UC Davis. They received the Big Sky's automatic bid to the FCS Playoffs where, after a first round bye, they defeated Southeast Missouri State in the second round before losing in the quarterfinals to Maine.

Previous season 
The Wildcats finished the 2017 season 11–3, 7–1 in Big Sky play to finish in a tie for the Big Sky championship with Southern Utah. Due to their head-to-head loss to Southern Utah in the regular season, they did not receive the Big Sky's automatic bid to the FCS Playoffs, but did receive an at-large bid to the FCS Playoffs, their second straight trip to the playoffs. In the first round, they defeated Western Illinois. In the second round, they avenged their regular season loss to Southern Utah. In the quarterfinals, they lost to eventual national runner-up, James Madison.

Preseason

Polls
On July 16, 2018, during the Big Sky Kickoff in Spokane, Washington, the Wildcats were predicted to finish in second place by both the coaches and media.

Preseason All-Conference Team
The Wildcats had a conference leading six players selected to the Preseason All-Conference Team.

Iosua Opeta – Sr. OT

Trey Tuttle, – So. K

Rashid Shaheed – So. KR

Jonah Williams – Jr. DE

LeGrand Toia, – Sr. LB

Brady May – Sr. ST Specialist

Schedule

Source: Official Schedule

Despite also being a member of the Big Sky, the game against Cal Poly was considered a non-conference matchup having no effect on conference standings.

Game summaries

at Utah

at Cal Poly

South Dakota

Northern Colorado

at Northern Arizona

at Eastern Washington

Montana State

at North Dakota

Sacramento State

at Southern Utah

at Idaho State

FCS Playoffs

Southeast Missouri State–Second Round

Maine–Quarterfinals

Ranking movements

References

Weber State
Weber State Wildcats football seasons
Big Sky Conference football champion seasons
Weber State
Weber State Wildcats football